The Dublin University Zoological Association was founded in 1853 to promote zoological studies in Ireland. Dublin University is now Trinity College Dublin.

It commenced proceedings in the Natural History Review in 1854.

Notable members

Robert Ball
Edward Perceval Wright
George Henry Kinahan
Robert Warren
William Archer
Samuel Haughton
George James Allman
Alexander Henry Haliday

References
Foster, J. W. and Chesney, H. C. G (eds.), 1977. Nature in Ireland: A Scientific and Cultural History. Lilliput Press. .

External links
Proceedings

1853 establishments in Ireland
Scientific organizations established in 1853
Zoology organizations
Scientific organisations based in Ireland
Organisations based in Dublin (city)